Aum Mangalam Singlem is a 2022 Gujarati romantic comedy film directed by Saandeep Patel. It stars Malhar Thakar, Aarohi Patel, Tatsat Munshi, Bhamini Oza Gandhi, Darshan Jariwala and Nisarg Trivedi in lead roles.

Synopsis
Childhood friends and sweethearts are ready to get married. But they also want to experience being single before taking the plunge.

Cast
The following cast members are in the film:
 Malhar Thakar as Siddharth
 Aarohi Patel as Vaani
 Bhamini Oza Gandhi as Ishita
 Tatsat Munshi as Max
 Darshan Jariwala
 Nisarg Trivedi
 Arati Patel
 Sanjay Galsar
 Devangi
 Ravi Gohil
 Jaini Shah
 Nilesh Parmar
 Rehan Meghani

Production 
Thakar and Aarohi were previously starred in 2017 romantic comedy film Love Ni Bhavai directed by Saandeep Patel. The team reunited for the film. The film was shot in Ahmedabad and in Polo Forest.

Soundtrack 

Aum Mangalam Singlem music is composed by duo of Sachin–Jigar.

Marketing and release 
The poster and trailer were released on 13 and 14 October 2022 respectively. The film was released on 18 November 2022.

Reception

Critical reception
Yesha Bhatt of The Times of India rated it 4 out of 5. She praised performances, story, theme, music, choreography and songs. Rachana Joshi writing for Mid-Day Gujarati rated it 4 out of 5 and praised the director, script, performances and music.

References

External links
 

2022 films
Indian romantic comedy films
Films shot in India
Films set in Ahmedabad
Films shot in Ahmedabad
Films shot in Gujarat
2020s Gujarati-language films
2022 romantic comedy films